Somendra Nath Mitra (31 December 1941 – 30 July 2020), popularly known as Somen Mitra, was an Indian politician. He was a member of the 15th Lok Sabha, elected from the Diamond Harbour constituency in West Bengal state in 2009 as a Trinamool Congress candidate. He was a member of the West Bengal Legislative Assembly from Sealdah from 1972 to 2006. He was the president of the state unit of the Indian National Congress. In July 2008, he left the Indian National Congress and formed a new party, named, Pragatisheel Indira Congress. In October 2009, the political party founded by him was officially merged with the All India Trinamool Congress. He rejoined his parent party Congress in January, 2014, before that he resigned from his MP post.
He became the president of West Bengal Pradesh Congress Committee for the second time on 22 September 2018 and served until his death on July 30, 2020.

References

External links
Soman Mitra Website
Somen Mitra -Political Profile
Profile on the website of the Lok Sabha

India MPs 2009–2014
2020 deaths
Indian National Congress politicians
1943 births
University of Calcutta alumni
Lok Sabha members from West Bengal
United Progressive Alliance candidates in the 2014 Indian general election
West Bengal MLAs 1972–1977
West Bengal MLAs 1982–1987
West Bengal MLAs 1987–1991
West Bengal MLAs 1991–1996
West Bengal MLAs 1996–2001
West Bengal MLAs 2001–2006
West Bengal MLAs 2006–2011
Trinamool Congress politicians from West Bengal
People from South 24 Parganas district